The int-alpA RNA motif is a conserved RNA structure that was discovered by bioinformatics.
int-alpA motif RNAs are found in Pseudomonadota, and one example is known in each of Acidobacteriota and Planctomycetota.  An int-alpA  was also detected in a purified phage, specifically Thalssomonas phage BA3.

int-alpA RNAs likely function in trans as small RNAs.  They are often located nearby to integrase genes that most resemble the homologous gene found in the P4 phage.  int-alpA RNAs also often occur nearby to alpA genes, a gene that is also related to phages.  Thus the RNA motif seems to function as part of phages.

References

Non-coding RNA